Jack Diprose (12 October 1905 – 12 October 2002) was an  Australian rules footballer who played with North Melbourne in the Victorian Football League (VFL).

Notes

External links 

1905 births
2002 deaths
Australian rules footballers from Victoria (Australia)
North Melbourne Football Club players
Prahran Football Club players